Indian Summer may refer to:
Indian summer, a period of sunny, warm weather in autumn

Film
 Indian Summer (1970 film), a Yugoslav film by Nikola Tanhofer
 Indian Summer (1972 film), original title La prima notte di quiete, a French/ Italian film by Valerio Zurlini
 Indian Summer (1973 film), a Bulgarian comedy-drama film by Milen Nikolov
 Indian Summer (1993 film), an American comedy-drama film by Mike Binder
 Indian Summer (1996 film) or Alive & Kicking, a British drama film by Nancy Meckler
 Indian Summer (2013 film), a film by Simon Brook

Television
 "Indian Summer", a 1973 episode of Man Alive 
 "Indian Summer", a 2007 episode of Mad Men
 Indian Summers, a 2015 British television drama on Channel 4

Literature 
 Der Nachsommer or Indian Summer, an 1857 Austrian novel by Adalbert Stifter
 Indian Summer (novel), an 1886 American novel by William Dean Howells
 "Indian Summer" (story), a 1932 American short story by Erskine Caldwell
 "Indian Summer" (poem), a 1976 poem by Jayanta Mahapatra
 Indian Summer (manga), a 2004 Japanese manga by Takehito Mizuki
 Indian Summer: The Secret History of the End of an Empire, a 2007 British non-fiction book by Alex von Tunzelmann
 John Wright's Indian Summers, a 2007 book about cricket

Music

Artists
 Indian Summer (British band), a progressive rock band active from 1969 to 1971
 Indian Summer (American band), an emo/post-hardcore band active from 1993 to 1994
 Indian Summer (record producer), an Australian electronic record producer active from 2010

Albums 
 Indian Summer (Indian Summer album) (1971)
 Indian Summer (Poco album) (1977)
 Live/Indian Summer, a 1981 album by Al Stewart
 Indian Summer (Go West album) (1992)
 Indian Summer (Mick Ronson album) (2001)
 Indian Summer (Carbon Leaf album) (2004)
 Indian Summer, a 2007 album by Dave Brubeck
 Indian Summer, a 2015 album by the band Hellions
 Indian Summer, a 1996 album by the band Landberk

Songs 
 "Indian Summer" (Victor Herbert song) (1919) With lyrics added by Al Dubin in 1939, it was recorded the same year by Tommy Dorsey and His Orchestra and became a jazz standard.
 "Indian Summer", by the Blossom Toes from If Only for a Moment (1969)
 "Indian Summer", by the Doors from Morrison Hotel (1970)
 "Indian Summer", by Audience from The House on the Hill (1971)
 "Indian Summer", an instrumental piece by Gary Bolstad, used in 1972 by Hannes Wader in "Heute hier, morgen dort"
 "L'Été indien" or "Indian Summer", a 1975 French song by Joe Dassin
 "Indian Summer", by Joe Walsh from But Seriously, Folks... (1978)
 "Indian Summer" (The Belle Stars song) (1983)
 "Indian Summer", by Larry Gatlin, Roy Orbison and Barry Gibb (1985)
 "Indian Summer", by Dream Academy (1987)
 "Indian Summer", by Beat Happening from Jamboree (1988), covered by Ben Gibbard, Luna and R.E.M.
 "Indian Summer", by Pedro the Lion from Control (2002)
 "Indian Summer", by Chris Botti from A Thousand Kisses Deep (2003)
 "Indian Summer" (Manic Street Preachers song) (2007)
 "Indian Summer", by America from Here & Now (2007)
 "Indian Summer" (Brooks & Dunn song) (2009)
 "Indian Summer" (Stereophonics song) (2013)

Art 
Indian Summer (painting), an 1875 painting by Polish painter Józef Chełmoński

See also
 Engine Summer, a 1979 novel by John Crowley